Vicenç Montoliu i Massana, better known as Tete Montoliu (28 March 1933 – 24 August 1997) was a Spanish jazz pianist from Catalonia, Spain. Born blind, he learnt braille music at age seven. His styles varied from hard bop, through afro-Cuban, world fusion, to post bop. He recorded with Lionel Hampton in 1956 and played with saxophonist Roland Kirk in 1963. He also worked with leading American jazz musicians who toured in, or relocated to Europe including Kenny Dorham, Dexter Gordon, Ben Webster, Lucky Thompson, and Anthony Braxton. Tete Montoliu recorded two albums in the US, and recorded for Enja, SteepleChase Records, and Soul Note in Europe.

Biography
Montoliu was born blind, in the Eixample district of Barcelona, Spain, and died in the same city. He was the only son of Vicenç Montoliu (a professional musician) and Àngela Massana, a jazz enthusiast, who encouraged her son to study piano. Montoliu's earliest piano teaching took place under the tutelage of Enric Mas at the private school for blind children he attended from 1939 to 1944. In 1944, Montoliu's mother arranged for Petri Palou to provide him with formal piano lessons.

From 1946 to 1953, Montoliu studied music at the Conservatori Superior de Música del Liceu in Barcelona, where he also met jazz musicians and became familiar with the idiom in jam sessions. During the early stages of his career, Montoliu was particularly influenced by the music of U.S. jazz pianist Art Tatum, although he soon developed his own style. (Coincidentally, Tatum was also impaired with extremely limited vision). Montoliu began playing professionally at pubs in Barcelona, where he was noticed by Lionel Hampton on 13 March 1956. Montoliu toured with Hampton through Spain and France and recorded Jazz Flamenco.

In 1967, Montoliu performed in New York City with bassist Richard Davis and drummer Elvin Jones. Two concerts at the Village Gate in April were recorded for the Impulse! label, but an album was never released. He frequently appeared in Madrid during the 1960s at the Whiskey Jazz Club with musicians Pedro Iturralde and singer Donna Hightower. During the 1970s, Montoliu travelled extensively throughout Europe. During the 1980s, he performed in concerts with musicians such as Dexter Gordon, Johnny Griffin, George Coleman, Joe Henderson, Dizzy Gillespie, Chick Corea, Hank Jones, Roy Hargrove, Idris Muhammad, Herbie Lewis and Jesse Davis, among others.

In 1996, shortly before his death a year later, Spain paid public tribute to Montoliu for his 50-year career in jazz.

He died in August 1997 from lung cancer, at the age of 64.

Discography
1965: A Tot Jazz (Concentric)
1965: A Tot Jazz/2 (Concentric)
1966: Tete Montoliu Presenta Elia Fleta (Concentric) with Elia Fleta
1968: Piano for Nuria (SABA)   
1969: Tete Montoliu Interpreta a Serrat (Discophon)    
1971: Body & Soul (Enja)
1971: That's All (SteepleChase) released 1985
1971: Lush Life (SteepleChase) released 1986
1971: Songs for Love (Enja) released 1974
1971: Recordando a Line (Discophon)
1973: Temas Latinoamericanos (Ensayo)
1973: Temas Brasilenos (Ensayo)
1974: Catalonian Fire (SteepleChase)
1974: Music for Perla (SteepleChase)
1974: Tete! (SteepleChase)
1974: Vampyria (BASF) with Jordi Sabatés
1976: Tête à Tete (SteepleChase)
1976: Tootie's Tempo (SteepleChase, released 1979)
1976: Words of Love (SteepleChase, [1978])
1977: Blues for Myself (Ensayo)
1977: Meditation (Timeless) with George Coleman
1977: Yellow Dolphin Street (Timeless)
1977: Secret Love (Timeless)
1977: Boleros (Ensayo)
1978: Catalonian Folksongs (Timeless)
1979: Al Palau (Zeleste-Edigsa) 
1979: Live at the Keystone Corner (Timeless, released 1981)
1979: Lunch in L.A. (Contemporary)
1980: Boston Concert (SteepleChase)
1980: I Wanna Talk About You (SteepleChase)
1980: Catalonian Nights Vol. 1 (SteepleChase, released 1981) 
1980: Catalonian Nights Vol. 2 (SteepleChase, released 1985) 
1980: Catalonian Nights Vol. 3 (SteepleChase, released 1998) 
1982: Face to Face (SteepleChase, [1984]) with Niels-Henning Ørsted Pedersen
1984: Carmina (Jazzizz) 
1986: The Music I Like to Play Vol. 1 (Soul Note)
1986: The Music I Like to Play Vol. 2 (Soul Note, released 1989)
1988: Orquestra Taller de Músics de Barcelona amb Tete Montoliu (Justine)
1989: New Year's Morning '89 (Fresh Sound) with Peter King    
1989: Sweet 'n Lovely 1 (Fresh Sound, released 1991) with Mundell Lowe
1989: Sweet 'n Lovely 2 (Fresh Sound, released 1991) with Mundell Lowe
1990: The Music I Like to Play Vol. 3 (Soul Note)
1990: The Music I Like to Play Vol. 4 (Soul Note, released 1992)
1990: The Man from Barcelona (Timeless)
1991: A Spanish Treasure (Concord Jazz)
1992: Catalonian Rhapsody (Alfa)
1992: Music for Anna (Mas i Mas)
1995: Tete en la Trompetilla: En Vivo (SRP Discos)
1995: Tete Montoliu en El San Juan (Nuevos Medios)
1996: Montoliu Plays Tete (DiscMedi)
1996: T'Estimo Tant (DiscMedi)
1997: Palau de la Musica Catalana (DiscMedi)
1997: Per Sempre Tete (DiscMedi)
1997: Momentos Inolvidables de una Vida (Fresh Sound)
2005: Jazz en Espana (Rtve)

As sideman
With Anthony Braxton
In the Tradition (SteepleChase, 1974)
In the Tradition Volume 2 (SteepleChase, 1974 [1977])
With Núria Feliu
Núria Feliu with Booker Ervin (Edigsa, 1965) with Booker Ervin
With Dexter Gordon
Cheese Cake (SteepleChase, 1964 [1979]) 
King Neptune (SteepleChase, 1964 [1979]) 
I Want More (SteepleChase, 1964 [1980])
Love for Sale (SteepleChase, 1964 [1981])
It's You or No One (SteepleChase, 1964 [1983])
Billie's Bounce (SteepleChase, 1964 [1983])   
Bouncin' with Dex (SteepleChase, 1976)
With Eddie Harris
Steps Up (SteepleChase, 1981)
With Rahsaan Roland Kirk
Kirk in Copenhagen (Mercury, 1963)
Dog Years in the Fourth Ring (32 Jazz, 1997) – appears on one track only
With Charlie Mariano
It's Standard Time Volume 1 (Fresh Sound)
It's Standard Time Volume 2 (Fresh Sound)
With Jordi Sabatés
Tot l'Enyor de Dema (Edigsa, 1976)
With Archie Shepp and Lars Gullin
The House I Live In (SteepleChase, 1963 [1980])
With Buddy Tate
Tate a Tete (Storyville, 1975)
With Lucky Thompson
Soul's Nite Out (Ensayo, 1969)
With Ben Webster
Ben Webster Meets Don Byas (MPS, 1968) with Don Byas
Ben Webster in Hot House (Hot House, 1972 [1979])
Gentle Ben (Ensayo, 1972)
With Barney Wilen
Barney Wilen Quartet - Live in Grenoble 1988
With Jerome Richardson
Groovin' High In Barcelona  (Fresh Sound, 1988)

References

External links
 Tete Montoliu Discography at www.JazzDiscography.com

1933 births
1997 deaths
Bebop pianists
Post-bop pianists
Hard bop pianists
Latin jazz pianists
Jazz pianists from Catalonia
Spanish jazz pianists
Blind musicians
Spanish blind people
Musicians from Catalonia
Musicians from Barcelona
Timeless Records artists
SteepleChase Records artists
Black Saint/Soul Note artists
20th-century pianists
20th-century Spanish musicians